The Lives of Others is a 2006 German drama film written and directed by Florian Henckel von Donnersmarck marking his feature film directorial debut. The plot is about the monitoring of East Berlin residents by agents of the Stasi, East Germany's secret police. It stars Ulrich Mühe as Stasi Captain Gerd Wiesler, Ulrich Tukur as his superior Anton Grubitz, Sebastian Koch as the playwright Georg Dreyman, and Martina Gedeck as Dreyman's lover, a prominent actress named Christa-Maria Sieland.

The film was released in Germany on 23 March 2006. At the same time, the screenplay was published by Suhrkamp Verlag. The Lives of Others won the Academy Award for Best Foreign Language Film. The film had earlier won seven Deutscher Filmpreis awards—including those for best film, best director, best screenplay, best actor, and best supporting actor—after setting a new record with 11 nominations. It also won the BAFTA Award for Best Film Not in the English Language and European Film Award for Best Film, while was nominated for the Golden Globe Award for Best Foreign Language Film. The Lives of Others cost US$2 million and grossed more than US$77 million worldwide.

Released 17 years after the fall of the Berlin Wall, marking the end of the German Democratic Republic, it was the first notable drama film about the subject after a series of comedies such as Good Bye, Lenin! and Sonnenallee. This approach was widely applauded in Germany even as some criticized the humanization of Wiesler's character. The film's authenticity was considered praiseworthy given that the director grew up outside of East Germany and was 16 when the Berlin Wall fell.

Plot

In 1984 East Germany, Stasi Hauptmann Gerd Wiesler, code name HGW XX/7, is ordered by his friend and superior, Lt. Col. Anton Grubitz, to spy on the playwright Georg Dreyman, who had so far escaped state scrutiny due to his Communist views and international recognition. Wiesler and his team bug Dreyman's apartment, set up surveillance equipment in an attic and begin reporting Dreyman's activities. Wiesler learns that Dreyman has been put under surveillance at the request of the Minister of Culture, Bruno Hempf, who covets Dreyman's girlfriend, actress Christa-Maria Sieland. After an intervention by Wiesler leads to Dreyman's discovering Sieland's relationship with Hempf, he implores her not to meet him again. Sieland flees to a nearby bar where Wiesler, posing as a fan, urges her to be true to herself. She returns home and reconciles with Dreyman.

At Dreyman's birthday party, his friend Albert Jerska, a blacklisted theatrical director, gives him sheet music for Sonate vom Guten Menschen (Sonata for a Good Man). Shortly afterwards, Jerska hangs himself. A grieving Dreyman decides to publish an anonymous article in Der Spiegel, a prominent West German newsweekly. Dreyman's article accuses the state of concealing the country's elevated suicide rates. When Dreyman and his friends feign a defection attempt to determine whether or not his flat is bugged, a now-sympathetic Wiesler does not alert the border guards or Grubitz and the conspirators believe they are safe. Since all East German typewriters are registered and identifiable, an editor of Der Spiegel smuggles Dreyman an ultra-flat typewriter with a red ribbon. Dreyman hides the typewriter under a floorboard of his apartment but is seen by Sieland.

A few days later, Dreyman's article is published, angering the East German authorities. The Stasi obtain a copy, but are unable to link it to any registered typewriter. Livid at being rejected by Sieland, Hempf orders Grubitz to arrest her. She is blackmailed into revealing Dreyman's authorship of the article, although when the Stasi search his apartment, they do not find the typewriter. Grubitz, suspicious that Wiesler has mentioned nothing unusual in his daily reports of the monitoring, has him do the follow-up interrogation of Sieland. Wiesler makes Sieland reveal the typewriter's location.

Grubitz and the Stasi return to Dreyman's apartment. Sieland realises that Dreyman will know she betrayed him and flees the apartment. When Grubitz removes the floorboard however, the typewriter is gone – Wiesler having removed it before the search team arrived. Unaware of this, Sieland runs to the street in despair and right into the path of a truck. A shocked Dreyman runs out after her and Sieland dies in his arms. Unable to prove his interference, Grubitz informs Wiesler that both the investigation and Wiesler's career are over; his remaining years with the Stasi will be in Department M, a dead-end assignment for disgraced agents. The same day, Mikhail Gorbachev is elected leader of the Soviet Union, beginning the process that will lead to the collapse of the Soviet bloc.

On 9 November 1989, Wiesler is steam-opening letters when a co-worker hears about the fall of the Berlin Wall on the radio. Realising what this means, Wiesler silently gets up and leaves the office, inspiring his co-workers to do the same.

Two years later, Hempf and Dreyman meet while attending a performance of Dreyman's play. Dreyman asks the former minister why he was never monitored. Hempf tells him that he had been under full surveillance in 1984: "We knew everything." Surprised, Dreyman searches his apartment, finds the now-abandoned listening devices and rips them off the walls.

At the Stasi Records Agency, Dreyman reviews the files kept while he was under surveillance. He reads that Sieland was released just before the second search and could not have removed the typewriter. As he goes through the files, he is confused by the large amount of contradictory information, but as he reaches the final report and sees a fingerprint in red ink, he realises that the officer in charge of his surveillanceStasi officer HGW XX/7had concealed his activities, including his authorship of the suicide article, and also removed the typewriter from his apartment. Dreyman tracks down Wiesler, who now works as a deliverer of advertisement brochures, but is unsure how to thank him and decides not to approach him.

Two years later, Wiesler passes a bookstore window display promoting Dreyman's new novel, Sonate vom Guten Menschen. He enters the bookstore and opens a copy of the book, discovering that it is dedicated "To HGW XX/7, in gratitude". Wiesler buys the book. When asked if he would like the book giftwrapped, Wiesler replies: "No, it's for me."

Cast

 Ulrich Mühe as Hauptmann Gerd Wiesler
 Sebastian Koch as Georg Dreyman
 Martina Gedeck as Christa-Maria Sieland
 Ulrich Tukur as Oberstleutnant Anton Grubitz
 Thomas Thieme as Minister Bruno Hempf
 Hans-Uwe Bauer as Paul Hauser
 Volkmar Kleinert as Albert Jerska
 Matthias Brenner as Karl Wallner
 Herbert Knaup as Gregor Hessenstein, Der Spiegel-journalist

 Charly Hübner as Udo Leveh, Wiesler's night shift
 Bastian Trost as Häftling 227, prisoner
 Marie Gruber as Frau Meineke, neighbour
  as typewriter expert
 Werner Daehn as Stasi officer-in-charge at house search
 Hinnerk Schönemann as Axel Stiegler, joketeller at Stasi
 Gabi Fleming as the prostitute "Ute"
 Ludwig Blochberger as Benedikt Lehmann, Wiesler's student

Production
Florian Henckel von Donnersmarck's parents were both from East Germany (originally they were from further east; the von Donnersmarcks belonged to Silesian nobility but the region was transferred to Poland from Germany after World War II). He has said that, on visits there as a child before the Berlin Wall fell, he could sense the fear they had as subjects of the state.

He said the idea for the film came to him when he was trying to come up with a scenario for a film class. He was listening to music and recalled Maxim Gorky's saying that Lenin's favorite piece of music was Beethoven's Appassionata. Gorky recounted a discussion with Lenin:

Donnersmarck told a New York Times reporter: "I suddenly had this image in my mind of a person sitting in a depressing room with earphones on his head and listening in to what he supposes is the enemy of the state and the enemy of his ideas, and what he is really hearing is beautiful music that touches him. I sat down and in a couple of hours had written the treatment." The screenplay was written during an extended visit to his uncle's monastery, Heiligenkreuz Abbey.

Although the opening scene is set in Hohenschönhausen prison (which is now the site of a memorial dedicated to the victims of Stasi oppression), the film could not be shot there because Hubertus Knabe, the director of the memorial, refused to give Donnersmarck permission. Knabe objected to "making the Stasi man into a hero" and tried to persuade Donnersmarck to change the film. Donnersmarck cited Schindler's List as an example of such a plot development being possible. Knabe's answer: "But that is exactly the difference. There was a Schindler. There was no Wiesler."

Donnersmarck teamed up with cinematographer Hagen Bogdanski to bring the story to life. Describing his inspiration for the film's Brechtian grey color palette, cinematographer Bogdanski recalls the streets of East Berlin from the period: "They were very dark. Everything was happening inside, in private".

Reception
The film was received with widespread acclaim. Film aggregate site Rotten Tomatoes reports a 93% "Certified Fresh" rating, based on 149 positive reviews out of 161, and an average rating of 8.31/10. The website's critical consensus states: "Unlike more traditional spy films, The Lives of Others doesn't sacrifice character for cloak and dagger chases, and the performances (notably that by the late Ulrich Muhe) stay with you." It also has a score of 89 out of 100 on Metacritic, based on 39 critics, indicating "universal acclaim".

A review in Daily Variety by Derek Elley noted the "slightly stylized look" of the movie created by "playing up grays and dour greens, even when using actual locations like the Stasi's onetime HQ in Normannenstrasse." Time magazine's Richard Corliss named the film one of the Top 10 Movies of 2007, ranking it at #2.  Corliss praised the film as a "poignant, unsettling thriller."

Film critic Roger Ebert gave the film four stars, describing it as "a powerful but quiet film, constructed of hidden thoughts and secret desires." A. O. Scott, reviewing the film in The New York Times, wrote that Lives is well-plotted, and added, "The suspense comes not only from the structure and pacing of the scenes, but also, more deeply, from the sense that even in an oppressive society, individuals are burdened with free will. You never know, from one moment to the next, what course any of the characters will choose." Los Angeles Times movie critic Kenneth Turan agreed that the dramatic tension of the film comes from being "meticulously plotted", and that "it places its key characters in high-stakes predicaments where what they are forced to wager is their talent, their very lives, even their souls." The movie "convincingly demonstrates that when done right, moral and political quandaries can be the most intensely dramatic dilemmas of all."

American commentator John Podhoretz called the film "one of the greatest movies ever made, and certainly the best film of this decade." William F. Buckley, Jr. wrote in his syndicated column that after the film was over, "I turned to my companion and said, 'I think that is the best movie I ever saw.'" John J. Miller of National Review Online named it No. 1 in his list of "The Best Conservative Movies" of the last 25 years.

Several critics pointed to the film's subtle building up of details as one of its prime strengths. The film is built "on layers of emotional texture", wrote Stephanie Zacharek in Salon online magazine. Josh Rosenblatt, writing in the Austin Chronicle called the film "a triumph of muted grandeur." Lisa Schwarzbaum, writing in Entertainment Weekly, pointed out that some of the subtlety in the film is due to the fact that "one of the movie's tensest moments take place with the most minimal of action" but that the director still "conveys everything he wants us to know about choice, fear, doubt, cowardice, and heroism." An article in First Things makes a philosophical argument in defense of Wiesler's transformation. The East German dissident songwriter Wolf Biermann was guardedly enthusiastic about the film, writing in a March 2006 article in Die Welt: "The political tone is authentic, I was moved by the plot. But why? Perhaps I was just won over sentimentally, because of the seductive mass of details which look like they were lifted from my own past between the total ban of my work in 1965 and denaturalisation in 1976."

Anna Funder, the author of the book Stasiland, in a review for The Guardian called The Lives of Others a "superb film" despite not being true to reality. She claims that it was not possible for a Stasi operative to have hidden information from superiors because Stasi employees themselves were watched and almost always operated in teams.

In a 2016 BBC poll, critics voted the film the 32nd greatest since 2000.

According to German author Christoph Hein, the movie is loosely based on his life story. In a 2019 article, he recalls that Donnersmarck interviewed him in 2002, and that his name was mentioned in the opening credits at the premiere screening. However, in Hein's opinion the highly dramatized events of the movie bear little resemblance to his life experience, which is why he asked Donnersmarck to delete his name from the credits. In Hein's words, "the movie does not depict the 1980s in the GDR", but is a "scary tale taking place in a fantasy land, comparable to Tolkien's Middle-earth."

Awards and honors

The film and its principals have won numerous awards. Among the most prestigious are:

 79th Academy Awards
 Best Foreign Language Film
 61st British Academy Film Awards
 Best Film Not in the English Language
 César Awards
 Best Foreign Film
 European Film Awards
 Best Film
 Best Actor: Ulrich Mühe
 Best Screenwriter: Florian Henckel von Donnersmarck
 German Film Awards
 Best Film
 Best Actor
 Best Supporting Actor
 Best Director
 Best Cinematography
 Best Production Design
 Best Screenplay
 Bavarian Film Awards 2006
 Best Actor: Ulrich Mühe
 Best Newcomer Director: Florian Henckel von Donnersmarck
 Best Screenplay: Florian Henckel von Donnersmarck
 Vilnius International Film Festival
 The Audience Award

The Lives of Others also appeared on many critics' lists of the ten best films of 2007.
 1st: James Berardinelli, ReelViews
 1st: Shawn Levy, The Oregonian
 2nd: Empire
 2nd: Marjorie Baumgarten, The Austin Chronicle
 2nd: Michael Sragow, The Baltimore Sun
 2nd: Richard Corliss, TIME magazine
 3rd: Rene Rodriguez, The Miami Herald
 4th: David Ansen, Newsweek
 4th: Stephen Holden, The New York Times
 5th: Roger Ebert, Chicago Sun Times
 5th: Richard Roeper, Chicago Sun Times
 5th: Liam Lacey and Rick Groen, The Globe and Mail
 5th: Owen Gleiberman, Entertainment Weekly
 7th: Christy Lemire, Associated Press
 7th: Tasha Robinson, The A.V. Club
 8th: A.O. Scott, The New York Times (tied with Michael Clayton)
 8th: Kyle Smith, New York Post

Acclaim
The Europe List, the largest survey on European culture established that the top three films in European culture are:
 Roberto Benigni's Life is Beautiful
 Donnersmarck's The Lives of Others
 Jean-Pierre Jeunet's Amélie
Belgium, Denmark, Germany, Greece, Ireland, Netherlands and Sweden had the film at number 1.

Proposed remake
In February 2007, Sydney Pollack and Anthony Minghella announced a deal with The Weinstein Company to produce and direct an English-language remake of The Lives of Others. Minghella died in March 2008 and Pollack died less than three months later.

Influence

Israeli intelligence controversy
In September 2014, 43 members of the Israeli elite clandestine Unit 8200 wrote a letter to Israel's prime minister and army chief, refusing further service and claiming Israel made "no distinction between Palestinians who are and are not involved in violence" and that information collected "harms innocent people." One of these people named a viewing of The Lives of Others as "the transformational moment".

2013 mass surveillance disclosures
The Lives of Others has been referred to in political protests following the 2013 mass surveillance disclosures. Daniel Ellsberg in an interview with Brad Friedman on KPFK/Pacifica Radio republished on salon.com stressed the importance of The Lives of Others in light of Edward Snowden's revelations:

Film critic and historian Carrie Rickey believes that The Lives of Others was one of two movies that influenced Snowden's actions, the other being the 1974 Francis Ford Coppola film The Conversation, both being about wiretappers troubled by guilt.

On 25 June 2013, after revelations of collaboration between the NSA and GCHQ, British journalist and documentary maker Sarfraz Manzoor tweeted that "Now would be a good time to pitch a British remake of The Lives of Others." On 16 July 2013, American novelist and frequent cable news commentator Brad Thor stated: "At what point did the Obama administration acquire the rights to reenact The Lives of Others?"

French President Nicolas Sarkozy gave an interview in Le Figaro expressing his outrage over being the target of surveillance himself. He drew a direct comparison to the film: "This is not a scene from that marvellous film The Lives of Others, about East Germany and the activities of the Stasi. It is not the case of some dictator acting against his political opponents. This is France." Because of this interview, sales of Le Figaro more than doubled.

Libel suit
Henckel von Donnersmarck and Ulrich Mühe were successfully sued for libel for an interview in which Mühe asserted that his second wife, Jenny Gröllmann, informed the Stasi about his activities while they were East German citizens through the six years of their marriage. Mühe's former wife denied the claims, although 254 pages of government records detailed her activities. However, Gröllmann's real-life controller later claimed he had made up many of the details in the file and that the actress had been unaware that she was speaking to a Stasi agent.

Literature and music
 Florian Henckel von Donnersmarck: Das Leben der anderen. Suhrkamp, Frankfurt am Main 2006, 
 Florian Henckel von Donnersmarck: Das Leben der anderen. Geschwärzte Ausgabe. Suhrkamp, Frankfurt am Main 2007, 
 The piano sonata "Sonata for a Good Man", used as the main transformation point of the Stasi Agent Gerd Wiesler, does not carry the name of the composer, as it is original music written for the film by Gabriel Yared.
 Regarding Beethoven's Appassionata, Lenin is quoted as having said that: "If I keep listening to it, I won't finish the revolution".
 An excerpt from a 1920 poem by Bertold Brecht, "Reminiscence of Marie A.", is recited in the film in a scene in which Wiesler reads it on his couch, having taken it from Dreyman's desk.
 The poem "Versuch es" by Wolfgang Borchert is set to music in the film and played as Dreyman writes the article about suicide. Borchert was a playwright whose life was destroyed by his experience of being drafted into the Wehrmacht in World War II and fighting on the Eastern Front.

See also
 List of films featuring surveillance
 Telephone tapping in the Eastern Bloc

References
Notes

Bibliography
 Paul Cooke (ed.): "The Lives of Others" and Contemporary German Film. A Companion. De Gruyter, Berlin/Boston 2013, .
 John Hamilton (musician, scholar): Conspiracy, Security, and Human Care in Donnersmarck's Leben der Anderen. Historical Social Research 2013 Vol. 38 (2013), No. 1, pp. 129–141.
 Article in the Boston Globe about the film's political impact in Germany
 Interview in indieWIRE with Florian Henckel von Donnersmarck about the film
 Directing 'The Lives of Others' (audio), a February 2007 Fresh Air interview
 Teaching material from digischool.nl

External links
 
 
 
 
 
 

2000s German-language films
2000s political thriller films
2000s spy films
2000s thriller drama films
2006 directorial debut films
2006 drama films
2006 films
Best Foreign Film César Award winners
Best Foreign Film Guldbagge Award winners
Best Foreign Language Film Academy Award winners
Best Foreign Language Film BAFTA Award winners
Cold War films
European Film Awards winners (films)
Films about intelligence agencies
Films about journalism
Films about playwrights
Films about security and surveillance
Films about sexual abuse
Films about suicide
Films about the Berlin Wall
Films about writers
Films critical of communism
Films directed by Florian Henckel von Donnersmarck
Films scored by Gabriel Yared
Films set in 1984
Films set in 1985
Films set in 1989
Films set in 1992
Films set in 1994
Films set in Berlin
Films set in East Germany
German political thriller films
German thriller drama films
Independent Spirit Award for Best Foreign Film winners
Sony Pictures Classics films
Works about the Stasi
Films distributed by Disney
2000s German films